Hubert Patrick O'Connor (17 February 1928 — 24 July 2007) was a Canadian Catholic bishop from Huntingdon, Quebec who was famously forced to resign from the church following charges of multiple sex crimes stemming from his time as principal at the Saint Joseph's Mission Residential School in Williams Lake. At the time, he was the highest ranking Catholic official in the world to ever be charged with a sex crime.

Church career
O'Connor was ordained to the priesthood on 5 June 1955 with the Oblates of Mary Immaculate after studying in Ottawa, Ontario. He worked within the church until being sent to Williams Lake as the principal of Saint Joseph's Mission from 1961 to 1967. (Saint Joseph's Mission is often shortened to 'St. Joseph's' or simply 'the Mission'.) St. Joseph's Mission was a key component of the Canadian Residential School System, a government and church-funded attempt to destroy Indigeneity in Canada through forced assimilation. It was during his time at St. Joseph's that O'Connor committed multiple sex crimes against underage Indigenous girls and boys and raped multiple Indigenous women.

On 15 October 1971, O'Connor was appointed Bishop of Whitehorse, Yukon. He then served as the Bishop of Prince George, British Columbia from 1986 to 1991 before resigning after being charged with multiple sex crimes.

Sexual assault charges
In 1991, several students from the St. Joseph's Mission Residential School in Williams Lake came forward with allegations of sexual assault and sexual indecency while O'Connor was principal between 1964–1967. During the preliminary trial in 1992 where O'Connor faced four sex charges, eight women testified that O'Connor repeatedly molested, raped, coerced, and physically and sexually abused young Indigenous girls at St. Joseph's Mission. Testimonies revealed that O'Connor also entered into sexual relationships with female staff at St. Joseph's whom were in their teens and early 20s. O'Connor targeted the all-female bagpipe and dance band in particular because of their  frequent fieldtrips across British Columbia and Canada that left them isolated with O'Connor. One woman testified that during these trips, O'Connor would "crawl into girls' bunks and start kissing them". Incidents such as these led to O'Connor fathering at least one child, who was given up for adoption to avoid public scandal.

Despite victims' testimonies, the trial was thrown out on a technicality after the Crown failed to disclose evidence to the defense. 

In 1994, upon review of the 1991 mistrial, the B.C. Court of Appeal approved the Crown's request to pursue charges and O'Connor was convicted of rape and indecent assault in 1996 of two young Indigenous women that occurred at St. Joseph's Residential School. Justice Wally Oppal sentenced O'Connor to two-and-a-half years in prison; he served just six months of his sentence before being released on $1,000 bail pending an appeal in 1997. 

In March 1998, the B.C. Court of Appeal acquitted O'Connor of indecent assault and ordered a new trial on one count of rape. However, three months later, in June, O'Connor participated in a seven-hour healing circle held at Esk'etemc, a Secwepemc First Nations community near Williams Lake formerly known as Alkali Lake Band. During the healing circle, O'Connor formally apologized to his victims. The victims later reported a sense of closure they had not found in the prior trials. The Crown, having considered the impact of O'Connor's apology and the extent to which the trials had retraumatized his victims, decided to drop the remaining rape charge.

In July 2021, a new sexual assault allegation against the now-deceased O'Connor surfaced. Ronald Wayne Petruk filed a suit with the Supreme Court of B.C. stating that O'Connor sexually assaulted Petruk and other teen boys with fellow priests at St. Joseph's Mission. The suit remains ongoing.

References

1928 births
2007 deaths
People convicted of indecent assault
Catholic Church sexual abuse scandals in Canada
Members of the clergy convicted of rape
20th-century Roman Catholic bishops in Canada
Missionary Oblates of Mary Immaculate
Roman Catholic bishops of Prince George
Roman Catholic bishops of Whitehorse
Sexual abuse of women in the Catholic Church